FCA India Automobiles Private Limited (FCAIPL), formerly known as "Fiat Group Automobiles India Private Limited", was formed in 1997. The company was established for the production of cars and engines under the brand Fiat, Abarth, and Jeep. It is the ninth largest Indian car manufacturer by sales in India.

History 
Fiat brand in India was earlier represented through a joint venture company called Fiat India Automobiles Pvt Ltd., FIAPL (Name changed to Fiat India Automobiles Ltd., FIAL later) founded in the year 1997 with Fiat S.p.A. and Tata Motors as the two partners coming together to produce cars for both brands in a plant set up through joint investments at Ranjangaon, in Pune district of Maharashtra. The board of directors for this company comprises five nominees each from Fiat and Tata. Another key interest area for the Tata-Fiat JV is the production of the 1.3 Multijet engine and  corresponding powertrains common to a number of both the Tata & Fiat brand cars in India like Fiat Palio, Fiat Grande Punto, Fiat Linea, Fiat Aventura, Fiat Urban Cross, Tata Vista and Tata Manza.

Even today the Tata Fiat JV plant operates under the FIAL name, as an independent entity and it produces Fiat & Tata brand cars for FCAIPL (Fiat India NSC) & Tata Motors respectively. The company presently employs about 2600 employees. It also undertakes contract manufacturing of engines for Maruti Suzuki India Ltd & Premier Automobiles. Premier Automobiles uses this engine for their compact SUV Premier Rio and the Suzuki cars that used Fiat 1.3 Multijet engines in Indian market include – Ritz, Swift, Swift DZire, SX4 & Ciaz, S-Cross, Vitara Brezza, Baleno.

Prior to this, Fiat used to sell the 1100, 124 and Uno in India, manufactured under licence by Premier Automobiles Limited.

In 2015 FCA officially launches the Maserati brand in India absent since 2013. The relaunch is managed directly by the FCA India division through the opening of three dealerships in the Indian territory and the launch of the Maserati Ghibli and Quattroporte sedans imported directly in from Grugliasco (Turin). The initial plan envisages sales of 100 units per year with the progressive expansion of the sales network. From 2016 the import of the Maserati Levante SUV and the Maserati GranTurismo coupè starts.

In February 2016, the entry of the Jeep brand on the indian market is announced. Mike Manley, then director of the Jeep brand and the APAC region of the FCA Group, announces that the first models to be imported from the United States are the Jeep Wrangler (JK), the Grand Cherokee and the sports version Grand Cherokee SRT, opening the first show rooms in the main Indian cities and addressing models to a target of luxury customers. In addition, the expansion of the Jeep brand involves the investment of 280 million US dollars for the production of the new model Jeep Compass with right-hand drive in the Pune plant from mid-2017. The Indian plant will produce all the Compass with right hand drive to be exported globally to Australia, New Zealand, UK, Japan, Brunei and South Africa.

The 1 June 2017 the first locally-produced Jeep Compass officially rolled off the assembly line at the company's Ranjangaon plant.

In 2017, Fiat signed a contract for the production and supply to Tata Motors starting from the end of 2018 of the 2.0 liter Multijet II turbo diesel engines. The 2.0-liter Multijet II engine in the same year went into production at the Indian Ranjangaon plant to be adopted by the Jeep Compass also produced locally. The supply to Tata Motors concerns about 70,000 per year to be fitted to the Tata Harrier SUV that went into production at the end of 2018.

In November 2018 the production of the Fiat Punto models (including the Abarth version), Avventura and Linea ended due to low sales; consequently the Fiat Chrysler Automobiles group withdraws the Fiat brand from the Indian market, focusing on the development of the Jeep brand that produces the right-hand-drive Jeep Compass exported globally and imports the Grand Cherokee and Wrangler models from the USA.

Manufacturing facilities
Fiat has a manufacturing plant at Ranjangaon, Maharashtra, which has an installed capacity to produce 355,000 cars and  engines, besides aggregates and components. The company plans to double the production capacity for both car units and engines in the next few years.
The car plant manufactures both Fiat and Tata cars, the latest additions in 2014 are the Fiat Linea facelift, Fiat Punto Evo, Tata Zest and Fiat Avventura. Engine manufacturing at Ranjangaon plant was the 1.2 litre Fire petrol, the 1.4 litre Fire naturally aspired and T-Jet turbocharged version and the small 1.3 litre Multijet diesel.

In April 2020 the Fiat India Ranjangaon plant has rolled out the 5,00,000th car.

In 2017 FCA  planned to start production of the right hand drive version of the new Jeep Compass launched on 31 July 2017 starting at 15 Lakhs.

Models

Current models

Jeep

Tata (contract manufacturing)

Maserati 
Maserati Ghibli (imported from Italy, 2015–present)
Maserati Quattroporte (imported from Italy, 2015–present)
Maserati Levante (imported from Italy, 2016–present)
Maserati MC20 (imported from Italy, 2022–present)

Discontinued models

Fiat 
Fiat Uno (1996–2002)
Fiat Siena (1999–2004)
Fiat Palio (2001–2010)
Fiat Palio Adventure (2002–2007)
Fiat Palio Weekend (2002–2005)
Fiat Petra (2004–2008)
Fiat 500 (imported from Poland, 2008–2010)
Fiat Grande Punto (2008–2014)
Fiat Linea (2009–2018)
Fiat Bravo (imported from Italy, 2010–2011)
Fiat Punto Evo (2014–2018)
Fiat Avventura (2014–2018)

Abarth 
Abarth 595 Competizione (imported from Poland, 2014–2017)

Jeep 
Jeep Wrangler JK (imported from USA, 2016–2020)
Jeep Grand Cherokee WK2 (imported from USA, 2016–2020)

Maserati 
Maserati GranTurismo (M145) (imported from Italy, 2016–2019)

Sales performance
FIAT sold 24000 vehicles in 2009 and registered an increase of 241% compared to the previous year sales which stood at 6,897 vehicles. It planned to sell 130,000 cars  annually in India by 2014.

See also
Fiat Chrysler Automobiles
Automobile industry in India

References

External links
  (Fiat)
  (Jeep)

Car manufacturers of India
Manufacturing companies based in Pune
Vehicle manufacturing companies established in 1997
Indian companies established in 1997
Fiat
Stellantis
Fiat Chrysler Automobiles
Indian subsidiaries of foreign companies
1997 establishments in Maharashtra